The Cincinnati Playhouse in the Park is a regional theatre in the United States. It was founded in 1959 by college student Gerald Covell and was one of the first regional theatres in the United States. Located in Eden Park, the first play that premiered at the Playhouse on October 10, 1960, was Meyer Levin's Compulsion. The Playhouse has gained a regional and national reputation for bringing prominent plays to Cincinnati and for hosting national premieres such as Tennessee Williams' The Notebook of Trigorin in 1996 and world premieres such as the Pulitzer Prize-nominated Coyote on a Fence in 1998 and Ace in 2006.

The Playhouse facility comprises two theatres, the larger Robert S. Marx Theatre and the smaller Shelterhouse. The Playhouse is among the members of the League of Resident Theatres. In addition to a full ten-month season of plays, the Playhouse also offers acting classes and programs for children.

In 1973-1975, the Playhouse was the first professional regional theatre to be led by Harold Scott. Scott was followed by Michael Murray, who was artistic director at the Playhouse until 1985. Murray, an early leader of the regional theatre movement, was co-founder of the Charles Playhouse in Boston.

The Cincinnati Playhouse was under the leadership of Edward Stern (Producing Artistic Director) and Buzz Ward (Executive Director) between 1992 and 2012. Ward had come to the Playhouse from Yale University, where he taught in the Drama Department and worked as a leader of the Yale Repertory Theatre in the late 1980s. In 2012, Blake Robison became artistic director and Buzz Ward was promoted to managing director. In the summer of 2021, Ward retired.

Awards 
In 2004, the Playhouse received a Tony Award for Best Regional Theatre. In 2007, the Playhouse received a second Tony Award for their revival of Company, which won Best Revival of a Musical. The production was directed by John Doyle and also won Drama Desk, Outer Critic's Circle and Drama League Awards for Best Revival of a Musical.

Directors

 Blake Robison, Artistic Director (2012—present)
 Buzz Ward, Managing Director (1992—2021)

Recent production history

2017–2018 Season 

 Shakespeare in Love, based on the screenplay by Marc Norman and Tom Stoppard, adapted by Lee Hall, directed by Blake Robison. September 2 – 30, 2017.
 The Curious Incident of the Dog in the Night, adapted from the novel by Mark Haddon, by Simon Stephens, directed by Marcia Milgrom Dodge. October 14 –November 11, 2017.
 A Christmas Carol, by Charles Dickens, adapted by Howard Dallin, directed by Michael Evan. November 22 – December 30, 2017.
 Million Dollar Quartet, by Colin Escott and Floyd Mutrux. January 20 – February 18, 2018.
 Marie and Rosetta, by George Brant, directed by Neil Pepe. March 3 – 31, 2018.
 Treasure Island, adapted from the novel by Robert Louis Stevenson, directed by Blake Robinson. April 21 – May 19, 2018.

Source:

2018–2019 Season 

 Misery, by William Goldman, based on the novel by Steven King, directed by Blake Robinson. September 1 – 29, 2018.
 Miss Bennet: Christmas at Pemberley, by Lauren Gunderson and Margot Melcon, directed by Eleanor Holdridge. October 13 – November 10, 2018.
 In the Heights, music and lyrics by Lin-Manuel Miranda, script by Quiara Alegría Hudes, direct by May Adrales. January 19 – February 17, 2019.
 Two Trains Running, by August Wilson, directed by Timothy Douglas. March 2 – 30, 2019.
 You're a Good Man, Charlie Brown, book, music, and lyrics by Clark Gesner, based on Charles M. Schulz’s comic strip Peanuts, directed by Bill Fennelly. April 20 – May 18, 2019.

Source:

References

External links
 Cincinnati Playhouse in the Park official website
 
 A 360 degree interactive virtual tour of the Cincinnati Playhouse in the Park

1959 establishments in Ohio
League of Resident Theatres
Regional theatre in the United States
Theatres in Cincinnati
Theatre companies in Cincinnati
Tony Award winners
Tourist attractions in Cincinnati
Mount Adams, Cincinnati